FS Class 396 was a class of 0-6-0 steam locomotives originally built for the Victor Emmanuel Railway (VE). They were designed for hauling passenger trains and were nicknamed "Mammoth".

History
VE ordered six locomotives from the Cail rolling stock factory and they were delivered in 1860. They were numbered 37-42. In 1865 the locomotives passed to the Società per le strade ferrate dell'Alta Italia (SFAI), which renumbered them 703-708, and later (probably in 1869) 767-772. In 1885, at the creation of the great national networks, the locomotives passed to the Rete Mediterranea (RM) and took the numbers 3942-3947. In 1905, at the time of nationalization, only five units arrived at the FS, which registered them as Class 396 with numbers from 3961-3965. They remained in service until 1911. By then, they were obsolete and they were scrapped in 1912.

Technical details
The locomotives were of simple design. The boiler pressure was 7 bar and they had two inside cylinders and Stephenson valve gear.

References

Further reading
 

0-6-0 locomotives
396
Railway locomotives introduced in 1860
Standard gauge locomotives of Italy
Rete Mediterranea steam locomotives
Passenger locomotives